The Electoral district of Mernda was an electoral district of the Victorian Legislative Assembly. 
Mernda was created in the 1945 redistribution, created from the abolished Electoral district of Bulla and Dalhousie.

Members

Election results

See also
 Parliaments of the Australian states and territories
 List of members of the Victorian Legislative Assembly

References

Former electoral districts of Victoria (Australia)
1945 establishments in Australia
1955 disestablishments in Australia